Cloesia parthia is a moth of the subfamily Arctiinae first described by Herbert Druce in 1889. It is found in Costa Rica, Nicaragua, Panama and the Brazilian state of São Paulo.

References

Lithosiini